Kiyoji (written: 清司 or 喜代治) is a masculine Japanese given name. Notable people with the name include:

 (1923–2004), Japanese sumo wrestler
 (1923 2001), Japanese photographer

Japanese masculine given names